Thomas Bælum (born 5 June 1978) is a Danish former professional footballerer who played as a defender. He is currently chief executive and caretaking sports director for AaB. Bælum has played 18 games for the Danish national U21 team.

Career 
Born in Aalborg, Bælum made his debut in professional football with local club Aalborg Boldspilklub (AaB) in the 1996–97 Superliga season. He helped AaB win the 1998–99 Superliga championship, as well as reaching two Danish Cup finals. In the winter 2003, he moved abroad to play for MSV Duisburg in Germany. He helped Duisburg win promotion for the top-flight Bundesliga in the summer 2005. When Duisburg were swiftly relegated back into the 2. Bundesliga in the summer 2006, he moved to Dutch club Willem II Tilburg in the Eredivisie where he spent two seasons, playing 62 league games and scoring one goal. Bælum was signed by the Danish second level side Silkeborg IF in the summer of 2008.

Honours
Danish Superliga: 1998–99

References

External links
 Danish national team profile 
 Grauballe UGF profile 
 
 Voetbal International profile 

Living people
1978 births
Sportspeople from Aalborg
Association football defenders
Danish men's footballers
Denmark under-21 international footballers
Aalborg Chang players
AaB Fodbold players
MSV Duisburg players
Willem II (football club) players
Bundesliga players
2. Bundesliga players